The I Don't Care Girl is a 1953 Technicolor film starring Mitzi Gaynor. It is a biography of entertainer Eva Tanguay.

Plot
The story of vaudeville performer Eva Tanguay (Mitzi Gaynor) is told to a couple of writers who plan to do a script about her for Hollywood producer George Jessel.

Her former partner Eddie McCoy (David Wayne) tells how they met. Recently widowed, he discovered Eva as a waitress, hearing her sing and offering her a job after she's fired. Eva falls for singer Larry Woods (Bob Graham), although piano player Charles Bennett (Oscar Levant) also has eyes for her. Eva is offended and sets out on her own when she finds out that Larry is married.

Bennett is found by the writers and claims Eddie's story is untrue. Eva was already singing in a cafe when she and Eddie first met. Unable to get Eddie to sober up, she breaks up their act and is discovered by Florenz Ziegfeld, who signs Eva for his famed Follies.

She learns that Larry's marriage is on the rocks, but is put off when the leading role in Larry's new operetta is apparently going to Stella (Hazel Brooks), another singer. Eva hires someone to throw tomatoes at Larry on stage, unaware that when he steps out to perform, Larry, having enlisted to fight in the war, will be wearing his Army uniform. Eva's prank backfires and she is disconsolate for quite a while, but in the end, Larry wins her back.

Cast
 Mitzi Gaynor as Eva Tanguay
 Oscar Levant as Charles Bennett
 David Wayne as Eddie McCoy
 Bob Graham as Larry Woods
 Craig Hill as Lawrence
 Hazel Brooks as Stella Forrest
 Warren Stevens as Keene
 George Jessel as himself

References

External links
 
 
 
 

1953 films
20th Century Fox films
1950s romantic musical films
American romantic musical films
Films directed by Lloyd Bacon
1950s English-language films
1950s American films